This is a list of districts in the London Borough of Hounslow:

Bedfont (historically East Bedfont)
Bedford Park (also partly in the London Borough of Ealing)
Brentford
Brentford End
Chiswick
Cranford
Feltham
Lower Feltham
North Feltham
Grove Park
Gunnersbury
Hanworth
Hatton
Heston
Hounslow
Hounslow West
Isleworth
Lampton
North Hyde
Osterley
Spring Grove
Woodlands

Lists of places in London